Malcolm Perry may refer to:

Malcolm Perry (American football) (born 1997), wide receiver for the Miami Dolphins
Malcolm Perry (physician) (1929–2009), American physician, first doctor to attend to President Kennedy at Parkland Memorial Hospital on day of his assassination
Malcolm Perry (physicist) (born 1951), professor of theoretical physics at the University of Cambridge